Human rights in Guinea, a nation of approximately 10,069,000 people in West Africa, are a contentious issue. In its 2012 Freedom in the World report, Freedom House named Guinea "partly free" for the second year in a row, an improvement over its former status as one of the least free countries in Africa.

The United States Bureau of Democracy, Human Rights and Labor, which produces annual human rights reports on the country, claims the most pressing human rights issues are the use of torture by security forces, and abuse of women and children through such acts as female genital mutilation.

Historical and political situation

Guinea gained its independence from France in 1958. Alpha Condé won the 2010 presidential election and in December 2010 become the country's first democratically elected president.
The following chart shows Guinea's ratings since 1972 in the Freedom in the World reports, published annually by Freedom House. A rating of 1 is "free"; 7, "not free".

Sekou Touré regime (1954–1984)
Amnesty International was claiming Guinea contained prisoners of conscience as early as their 1969 report. In 1968 over one hundred people were arrested, and 13 sentenced to the death penalty, for their roles in an alleged plot against the government. Included in those arrested were cabinet ministers and high-level military officers. After the 1970 Portuguese invasion of the capital, the government stepped up its campaign against political opposition and by the end of the year at least 85 people had reportedly been sentenced to death. Thousands had been arrested, including 22 Europeans, Germans, French, and Italians among them.

In December 1970 the Archbishop of Conakry, Raymond-Marie Tchidimbo, was sentenced to hard labour for refusing to read government documents from the pulpit calling on Christians to support the government against foreign imperialism. He and at least a thousand other political prisoners remained detained in 1977. A report published in June 1977 by the International League for Human Rights estimated the number of political prisoners at over 3000, alleging prisoners were subject to starvation, torture, murder, and arbitrary execution. The most notorious prison was Camp Boiro, which included amongst its prisoners Diallo Telli.

After severe criticism of its human rights situation, and the withholding of aid by the United States under the Food for Peace Act, the government attempted a rapprochement strategy with its neighbours and the West, and claimed to be improving its internal situation. In August and October 1977, however, the government fired upon a series of economic protests and killed an unknown number of women. They then began to round up those thought responsible. By 1978 reports were estimating the number of political prisoners had grown to 4000.

In late 1978 President Sékou Touré proclaimed to journalists that all prisoners who had been sentenced to execution at Boiro were now dead. He went on to explain that Amnesty International was "trash". By 1979 reports were claiming fewer than 20 of the original arrestees were still being held at Boiro. Hundreds who had been arrested never reappeared, however, and some sources put the number dead at over 4000. Arrests continued, however.

A May 1980 grenade attack on the Palais du Peuple and a February 1981 bomb explosion at Conakry Airport precipitated two more waves of politically motivated arrests, with hundreds detained and reports of death. People continued to be killed at Boiro through what was known as the "black diet" – a complete lack of food and water. The Guinean government also reached agreements with the governments of Liberia and Côte d'Ivoire to forcibly repatriate expatriates involved in opposition activity. Reports of detainment and beatings upon their arrival leaked to the outside world.

In September 1982, Touré held a news conference proudly proclaiming that there were no more political prisoners being held in the country. He could not explain the fate of approximately 2900 people arrested since 1969 who remained unaccounted for. Reports of the number of prisoners at Boiro continued to range from several hundred to thousands. Torture methods reportedly used at the prison included bondage, forced burning with cigarettes, and electric shocks applied to the head and genitals. After Touré's death in March 1984, major political changes were afoot.

Lansana Conté regime (1984–2008)
On 3 April 1984 the military took control of the country, suspended the constitution, dissolved the ruling Parti Démocratique de Guinée, and launched the Military Committee for National Redress to run the nation under Lansana Conté. In their first public statement the new rulers claimed they would treat human rights as a priority and named those who had "lost their lives simply because they wanted to express their opinions on the country's future" as martyrs. Camp Boiro was closed and all political prisoners immediately released. Following the death of a criminal suspect in police custody in September 1984, protests erupted in Kamsar and 200 people were arrested.

A coup d'état was announced six hours following Conté's death on 22 December 2008. On 27 September 2009, the day before planned demonstrations Conakry, the government declared demonstrations illegal. Thousands of protestors defied the ban, assembling in a soccer stadium. 157 were left dead after the level of violence used by security forces escalated.

Human Rights organizations demanded justice for the killing of more than 150 peaceful demonstrators by Guinean security forces on September 28, 2009, in a stadium. The domestic investigation begun in February 2010 and concluded in 2017, where 13 suspects were charged and 11 were sent for trial. However, some of the suspects continued being in an influential position. The trial was last scheduled for July, but no progress was made in the case. Association of Victims, Relatives and Friends of September 28, 2009 (AVIPA), Equal Rights for All (MDT), the Guinean Human Rights Organization (OGDH), the International Federation for Human Rights, Amnesty International, and Human Rights Watch have made the call of justice.

Current issues (2010–present)

Legal system
Sixteen people were sentenced to death in 2011, which is apparently at odds with President Condé's assertion that Guinea is abolitionist.

Arbitrary arrest and torture
While the constitution prohibits arbitrary arrest and detention, its practice is quite common. Prisoners are beaten and raped by police. Action by Christians for the Abolition of Torture alleges that four youths accused of stealing were tortured by police in 2011. Abuses at the Kassa Island military prison in 2009 reportedly included castration. Amnesty has two reports of the use of torture in 2011: in February a man in Mamou was taken to the local police station after setting up roadblocks and beaten while handcuffed. In April a man was arrested in Dixinn and beaten at a local station.

Minority and women's rights

Although 50 people were arrested for rape in 2011, no prosecutions were made. A 2003 study revealed that more than 20% of women at a local hospital were there for sexual violence. The situation is reported to remain unchanged, and more than half of rape victims are girls between 11 and 15 years. Many rapes occur at school.

Human Rights Watch claims that thousands of young girls working as housekeepers are raped by their employers. Dozens of women were openly raped by security forces during the 2007 and 2009 political troubles. Despite being illegal, female genital mutilation is widely practiced by all ethnic groups: a 2005 Demographic and Health Survey reported that 96 percent of women have gone through the operation. Prosecutions of its practitioners are nonexistent.

The country lacks any laws prohibiting discrimination against people with disabilities.

Guinea is ethnically diverse, and people tend to identify strongly with their ethnic group. Racial rhetoric during political campaigns resulted in the deaths of at least two people in 2011.

Although homosexuality is illegal, no one has been charged for at least a decade. Same sex relations are considered a strong taboo, and the prime minister declared in 2010 that he doesn't consider sexual orientation a legitimate human right.

Freedom of speech

Media and censorship
Media freedom is guaranteed by the constitution. Journalists critical of the government are, however, reportedly harassed and arrested by security forces.

Freedom of religion

Religious rights are generally respected, though it is claimed non-Muslims are discriminated against in the allocation of government employment. Restrictions exist on Muslims' freedom to convert to other religions.

International treaties
Guinea's stances on international human rights treaties are as follows:

See also

Human trafficking in Guinea
Internet censorship and surveillance in Guinea

Notes 
1.Note that the "Year" signifies the "Year covered". Therefore the information for the year marked 2008 is from the report published in 2009, and so on.
2.As of 1 January.
3.The 1982 report covers the year 1981 and the first half of 1982, and the following 1984 report covers the second half of 1982 and the whole of 1983. In the interest of simplicity, these two aberrant "year and a half" reports have been split into three year-long reports through interpolation.

References

External links
Reports
Country Report on Human Rights Practices for 2011 by the United States Department of State
2012 Human rights report  by Amnesty International
 Freedom in the World 2012 Report , by Freedom House
International organizations
Guinea  at Amnesty International
Guinea at Human Rights Watch
Guinea at FIDH
Guinea at the Office of the United Nations High Commissioner for Human Rights (OHCHR)
Guinea  at UNICEF
Djibouti at the International Freedom of Expression Exchange (IFEX) (also available in French)